Achthina ctenodes is a moth in the  family Dudgeoneidae, and the only species in the genus Achthina. It is found in Kenya.

References

Natural History Museum Lepidoptera generic names catalog

Dudgeoneidae
Monotypic moth genera